

Champions
National League: Boston Beaneaters

National League final standings

Statistical leaders

Notable seasons
Philadelphia Phillies left fielder Ed Delahanty led the NL in home runs (19), runs batted in (146), total bases (347), and slugging percentage (.583). He was second in the NL in hits (219) and adjusted OPS+ (164). He was third in the NL in batting average (.368) and runs scored (145).
New York Giants pitcher Amos Rusie had a win–loss record of 33–21 and led the NL in innings pitched (482), strikeouts (208), and shutouts (4). He was second in the NL in earned run average (3.23). He was third in the NL in wins (33) and adjusted ERA+ (143).

Events
June 19 – Baltimore Orioles outfielder Piggy Ward reached base a record 17 times in 17 consecutive plate appearances, a streak he started on June 16.
August 16 – Bill Hawke of the Baltimore Orioles pitches a no-hitter against the Washington Senators in a 5–0 win.
August 18 – The Boston Beaneaters set a Major League record which still stands for the most batters hit by a pitch in an inning. Four batters are hit in the 2nd inning in the game with the Pittsburgh Pirates.
November 21 – Ban Johnson is named president, secretary, and treasurer of the recently reorganized Western League. Under Johnson's leadership the WL will prosper.

Births

January
January 1 – Frank Fuller
January 2 – Jesse Altenburg
January 3 – George Shively
January 10 – Joe Gingras
January 10 – Marty Herrmann
January 12 – Lefty Lorenzen
January 12 – Charlie Young
January 14 – Billy Meyer
January 17 – Luke Glavenich
January 20 – Al Gould
January 20 – Cliff Hill
January 25 – Abe Bowman
January 28 – Guy Cooper
January 30 – Red Smyth
January 31 – George Burns

February
February 2 – Cy Warmoth
February 7 – Charlie Jamieson
February 10 – Bill Evans
February 12 – Earl Sheely
February 13 – Ben Dyer
February 17 – Eddie Onslow
February 17 – Wally Pipp
February 21 – Norman Plitt
February 21 – Marsh Williams
February 23 – Jim O'Neill
February 25 – Phil Slattery
February 28 – Sam Mayer

March
March 8 – Ray Francis
March 9 – Billy Southworth
March 9 – Lefty Williams
March 12 – Joe Engel
March 12 – Alex Gaston
March 18 – Russ Wrightstone
March 20 – Johnny Butler
March 23 – Ray Kremer
March 24 – George Sisler
March 26 – Frank Brower
March 27 – Charlie Boardman

April
April 4 – Pete Kilduff
April 7 – Desmond Beatty
April 7 – Fletcher Low
April 9 – Bill Morrell
April 9 – Tiny Osborne
April 10 – Walter Ancker
April 11 – Hal Deviney
April 11 – Spencer Pumpelly
April 13 – Roy Walker
April 14 – Ben Tincup
April 15 – Vern Hughes
April 15 – Jack Sheehan
April 24 – Walt Smallwood
April 27 – Allen Sothoron
April 29 – Shag Thompson

May
May 6 – Pat Griffin
May 7 – Bill Hobbs
May 8 – Ed Hemingway
May 8 – Edd Roush
May 8 – Roy Wilkinson
May 9 – Bill Bolden
May 12 – Hob Hiller
May 12 – George Kaiserling
May 15 – Sam Fishburn
May 20 – Walter Bernhardt
May 20 – Fritz Von Kolnitz
May 21 – Herold Juul
May 22 – Pat Parker
May 23 – Elmer Leifer
May 25 – Bill Bankston

June
June 1 – Guy Morton
June 1 – Eddie Palmer
June 5 – Herb Hall
June 9 – Irish Meusel
June 9 – Mack Wheat
June 18 – Ben Shaw
June 22 – Larry Pezold
June 26 – Elmer Ponder
June 27 – Charlie Wheatley

July
July 1 – Howie Camp
July 3 – Dickey Kerr
July 6 – Shovel Hodge
July 7 – Dutch Wetzel
July 8 – Bill Brown
July 8 – Dan Woodman
July 9 – Turner Barber
July 9 – Harry Eccles
July 9 – Tony Faeth
July 11 – Clarence Blethen
July 11 – Milt Stock
July 13 – Luther Farrell
July 14 – John Peters
July 15 – Red Oldham
July 16 – Doc Prothro
July 21 – Ray Keating
July 22 – Jesse Haines
July 24 – Joe Schultz
July 31 – Allen Russell

August
August 5 – Jack Harper
August 8 – Jack Smith
August 11 – Red Causey
August 12 – John Michaelson
August 16 – Cy Wright
August 18 – Bernie Duffy
August 18 – Burleigh Grimes
August 18 – William Marriott
August 19 – Jim Shaw
August 22 – Lyle Bigbee
August 22 – Oscar Fuhr
August 23 – Sam White
August 24 – Paul Des Jardien
August 24 – Bartolo Portuondo
August 25 – Bob Gandy
August 27 – Howie Haworth
August 27 – Dizzy Nutter
August 30 – Ralph Head
August 31 – Murphy Currie

September
September 5 – Don Rader
September 6 – Bill Murray
September 9 – Walt Kinney
September 11 – Ray Grimes
September 11 – Roy Grimes
September 13 – John Kelleher
September 13 – Mike McNally
September 13 – Dutch Ruether
September 15 – Speed Martin
September 17 – Whitey Glazner
September 20 – Jack Bradley
September 20 – Doc Wallace
September 22 – Ira Flagstead
September 22 – Pat French
September 25 – Ed Chaplin
September 28 – Mike Massey
September 28 – Cy Rheam
September 30 – Duke Kelleher

October
October 5 – Paul Speraw
October 6 – Pat Duncan
October 6 – Johnny Tillman
October 12 – Hank Ritter
October 13 – Pickles Dillhoefer
October 13 – Dick Spalding
October 15 – John Karst
October 15 – Gil Whitehouse
October 19 – Lloyd Christenbury
October 25 – Vic Aldridge
October 31 – Bill Herring

November
November 1 – Tom Burr
November 1 – Otis Lawry
November 4 – Bill Leinhauser
November 5 – Spencer Heath
November 6 – Dana Fillingim
November 15 – Joe Leonard
November 16 – Cristóbal Torriente
November 21 – Ziggy Hasbrook
November 25 – Gene Bailey
November 28 – Benn Karr
November 28 – Frank O'Rourke
November 29 – Carter Elliott
November 29 – Charlie Snell
November 30 – Tex Hoffman

December
December 2 – Tommy Vereker
December 4 – Luke Nelson
December 5 – Joe Gedeon
December 6 – Hack Eibel
December 12 – Les Hennessy
December 17 – Bert Yeabsley
December 18 – Dominic Mulrenan
December 18 – Rinaldo Williams
December 19 – Paul Strand
December 22 – Marty Becker
December 22 – Jesse Winters
December 29 – Joe Smith

Deaths

January 4 – Jim Halpin, 29, shortstop in 1882, and 1884–1885.
March – Joseph Quinn, ??, catcher for two teams in 1881.
April 18 – Fred Siefke, 23, third baseman for the 1890 Brooklyn Gladiators.
October 10 – Lip Pike, 48, outfielder for several teams from 1871 to 1881 who batted .300 four times in the National Association and twice in the NL, winning four home run titles; the sport's first Jewish star.
December 2 – Bill Gleason, 25, pitcher for the 1890 Cleveland Infants.

References

External links
1893 National League season team stats at Baseball Reference